A melanocytoma is a rare pigmented tumor that has been described as a variant of the melanocytic nevus and is a derivative of the neural crest. The term "melanocytoma" was introduced by Limas and Tio in 1972.

Histology
Histologically, the tumor is described by large, uniformly shaped polyhedral nevus cells that are pigmented and closely packed. Typically, it lacks signs of malignancy such as high mitotic rate, necroses or infiltrative growth. Like the malignant melanoma, it shows an immunohistological profile with S-100 protein-, vimentin- and HMB-45-positive tumor cells.

Optic melanocytoma

Most commonly the melanocytoma is found on or adjacent to the optic nerve as the optical melanocytoma. The lesion can be found at any age. Location and size could lead to clinical symptoms. While the melanocytoma is generally considered to be a benign tumor, it has a potential for growth, recurrence, and transformation to a malignant melanoma. Because malignant transformation is rare, optical melanocytomas can usually be observed. Thus, in asymptomatic patients, regular observation by fundoscopy is indicated, perhaps supported by ocular ultrasonography.

Meningeal melanocytoma
The meningeal melanocytoma is found on the leptomeninges of the brain, typically in the area of the base of the brain and brain stem, or the spine. Symptoms may be absent or related to growth and location. Like with the optic version, growth, recurrence, and malignant transformation are the main problems. Meningeal melanocytomas represent 0.06-0.1% of brain tumors. In a 2003 review of 95 cases by Rahimi-Movaghar et al, 45 were intracranial (mostly supratentorial) and 50 spinal or along spinal roots. The authors noted that the median age was 40 years for patients with intracranial and 49 for those with spinal tumors. Lesions were more common in women (57.9%). The review showed a recurrence rate of 26.3% and a death rate of 10.5% over 46 months. A 2001 review by Rades et al concluded that complete resection is the best treatment. If resection is incomplete, postoperative radiotherapy should be applied.

Differential diagnosis
Pigmented tumors raise the possibility of a malignant melanoma, a condition that may present diagnostic and therapeutic dilemmas. In the differential diagnosis, schwannoma and meningioma with pigmentation are to be considered as well.

Veterinary medicine
Melanocytomas have been described in animals, for instance, dogs and cats.

See also
 Dermal melanocytoma
 Melanocytic tumors of uncertain malignant potential

References

Ocular neoplasia
Brain tumor
Nervous system neoplasia
Melanocytic nevi and neoplasms